Anne Lee McGihon (born June 1, 1957) is an American attorney, former social worker, and politician who served as a member of the Colorado House of Representatives from 2003 to 2009. A Democrat, McGihon represented House District 3, which includes south Denver.

Early life and education
Born in Newport, Rhode Island, McGihon earned a bachelor's degree from McGill University in 1978, and then a master of social work degree from Florida State University in 1980. She worked as a clinical social worker in the Tampa Veterans Administration Hospital spinal cord unit before entering law school, where she graduated with a J.D., also from Florida State University, in 1984.

Career 
McGihon has practiced law in Florida, Washington, D.C., and Colorado. She worked at Kirkpatrick and Lockhart from 1987 to 1989, then with Holland and Hart, and The Jefferson Group before opening her own private practice, McGihon and Associates in 1993. McGihon specializing in business, litigation, and trusts and estates.

In the 2008 session of the Colorado General Assembly, McGihon chaired the House Health and Human Services Committee, sits on the House Appropriations Committee, and is vice-chair of the Joint Legal Services Committee.

McGihon served as Chair of the Colorado Commission on Uniform State Laws from January 2013 to July 2019. She also served as a regular member from 2005 to 2011.

References

External links
 Anne McGihon profile, Colorado General Assembly
 Anne McGihon - campaign site

Florida State University alumni
Florida State University College of Law alumni
Living people
Members of the Colorado House of Representatives
People from Newport, Rhode Island
Women state legislators in Colorado
1957 births
21st-century American women